Chip McKibben (born June 23, 1965) is an American former rower. He competed in the men's quadruple sculls event at the 1992 Summer Olympics.

References

External links
 

1965 births
Living people
American male rowers
Olympic rowers of the United States
Rowers at the 1992 Summer Olympics
Sportspeople from Escondido, California
Pan American Games medalists in rowing
Pan American Games gold medalists for the United States
Rowers at the 1995 Pan American Games